The Church of the Holy Name and Our Lady of the Sacred Heart is a Roman Catholic church at 117 Bow Common Lane, E3 in Bow Common, East London. It is dedicated to the Holy Name of Jesus and Our Lady of the Sacred Heart and designed by Frederick Arthur Walters. 

It opened in 1894 and is now home to the Vietnamese chaplaincy in the Archdiocese of Westminster.

References

External links

1894 establishments in England
Roman Catholic churches completed in 1894
Roman Catholic churches in the London Borough of Tower Hamlets
Frederick Walters buildings
Bow Common
Overseas Vietnamese religious buildings and structures